Joseph Charles Malay (October 25, 1905 – March 19, 1989) was an American baseball player who played in nine games for the New York Giants in  and . He batted and threw left-handed.

See also
List of second-generation Major League Baseball players

External links

1905 births
1989 deaths
Major League Baseball first basemen
Baseball players from New York (state)
New York Giants (NL) players
Sportspeople from Brooklyn
Baseball players from New York City
Scottdale Scotties players
Bridgeport Bears players
Fort Worth Cats players
Galveston Buccaneers players
Hartford Senators players
Little Rock Travelers players
Montreal Royals players
Scranton Miners players
Wilkes-Barre Barons (baseball) players
Burials in Connecticut